The 1950 Loyola Lions football team was an American football team that represented Loyola University of Los Angeles (now known as Loyola Marymount University) as an independent during the 1950 college football season. In their second season under head coach Jordan Olivar, the Lions compiled an 8–1 record and outscored their opponents by a combined total of 297 to 137.

After starting the season with seven wins, the team was ranked No. 20 in the AP Poll for the next two weeks – the first and only time a Loyola football team was ranked. Quarterback Don Klosterman was the team's offensive star.

Schedule

References

Loyola
Loyola Lions football seasons
Loyola Lions football